The 2009 World Shotgun Championships were held in August 2009 in Maribor, Slovenia. As in all odd-numbered years, separate ISSF World Shooting Championships were carried out in the trap, double trap and skeet events.

Medal count

Men

Women

Competition schedule

References
Official schedule

ISSF World Shooting Championships
World Shotgun Championships
Shooting
2009 in Slovenian sport
Sport in Maribor
Shooting competitions in Slovenia